Pepi is the name of:

People
Regnal name
 Pepi I Meryre, the third pharaoh of the Sixth dynasty of Egypt (2332–2282 BC)
 Pepi II Neferkare, the fifth pharaoh of the Sixth dynasty of Egypt (2284–2184 BC)
 Pepi III Seneferankhre, a pharaoh of the Sixteenth dynasty of Egypt

Given name
 Pepi Diaz, a Cuban-American attorney from Miami, Florida
 Pepi Lederer, an actress and writer

Surname
 Vincent Pepi, an abstract expressionist painter
 Ricardo Pepi, American soccer player
 Ryan and Kyle Pepi, twin child actors

Nickname
 Josef "Pepi" Bican, Czech footballer

 Fiction
 Josefine “Pepi” Mutzenbacher, heroine of the eponymous Austrian novel from 1906

Places
 Pepi Mountains, a former name of North Korea's Hamgyong Mountain Range